Tim Radford (born 1940) is a British–New Zealand freelance journalist, born in New Zealand in 1940 and educated at Sacred Heart College, Auckland. At 16, he joined The New Zealand Herald as a reporter. He moved to the United Kingdom in 1961, working at first as a Whitehall information officer.

Radford worked for The Guardian newspaper for 32 years. Over the course of his career, he was letters editor, arts editor, literary editor, and science editor — holding the latter post from 1980 until 2005. He also served on the UK committee for the International Decade for Natural Disaster Reduction. He is married with two adult children.

Awards
Radford has won four Association of British Science Writers awards:

 Lifetime achievement award for services to science journalism, 2004
 Best feature on science subject in a national or regional newspaper, 2004, for  Touching the Void, published in The Guardian on 22 July 2004
 Best communication of science in a non-science context, 2001, for Tell us, Solly, published in the London Review of Books on 20 September 2001
 Other awards in 1992 and 1997

References

Bibliography
 The Consolations of Physics: Why the Wonders of the Universe can make you Happy (2018), 192 pages, Sceptre (August 2018), Paperback 
 The Address Book: Our Place in the Scheme of Things (2009), 224 pages, Fourth Estate (April 2011), Paperback ; Hardback 
 The Crisis of Life on Earth: Our Legacy from the Second Millennium (1990), 224 pages, Thorsons (October 1990), Hardback 

British male journalists
Living people
The Guardian journalists
New Zealand expatriates in England
1940 births
People educated at Sacred Heart College, Auckland